Hansie is a feature film, produced in South Africa by Global Creative Studios and directed by Regardt van den Bergh. It is based on the true story of cricketer Hansie Cronje. The movie was released on 24 September 2008 in South African cinemas and the Collectors Edition DVD on 24 November 2008.
"How do you start over once you have betrayed a nation's trust?" The news of Hansie Cronje's involvement with Indian bookmakers and his resulting public confession rocked the international sporting community. An unprecedented rise to glory was followed by the most horrific fall. A tarnished hero fueled the nation's fury. Hansie, once South African cricket's golden boy, had been stripped of everything he had held dear: a glorious captaincy, the support of his former teammates and the respect of a nation. In its place the stinging rejection of cricket administrators and the humiliating dissection of his life on international television made his retreat into depression inevitable. Hansie's bravest moment in finally confessing his involvement with bookies had suddenly become a tightening noose around his neck.

Lead actors: Frank Rautenbach as Hansie and Sarah Thompson as Bertha Cronje.

External links
 

2008 films
Cricket films
Films directed by Regardt van den Bergh
South African drama films
Films based on actual events